is a Japanese voice actor. He is represented by Aoni Production.

Filmography

TV Animation

Anime Films
 Hanasaku Iroha: Home Sweet Home (2013), Ayato Matsumae
 Boruto: Naruto the Movie (2015), Darui
 Ryōma! Shinsei Gekijōban Tennis no Ōji-sama (2021), Foo
 Dragon Ball Super: Super Hero (2022), Carmine

Original Video Animation
 The Ancient Magus Bride: Those Awaiting a Star (2016–2017), Elias Ainsworth

Original Net Animation
 A.I.C.O. -Incarnation- (2018), Daisuke Shinoyama
 Ultraman (2019–2022), Jack
 Kengan Ashura (2019), Kirimi Takakaze
 SD Gundam World Heroes (2021), Nobunaga Gundam Epyon
 Spriggan (2022), Larry Markson
JoJo's Bizarre Adventure: Stone Ocean (2022), D an' G

Video Games
 Tokyo Mirage Sessions ♯FE (2015), Doug
 Princess Closet (2016), Tachibana Shuu
 Kyoei Toshi (2017), Hideyasu Otsuka
 Disney Twisted-Wonderland (2020), Ashton Vargas

References

External links 

 Official Agency Profile  
 

1982 births
Living people
Japanese video game actors
Japanese male voice actors
Aoni Production voice actors
Voice actors from Hyōgo Prefecture
21st-century Japanese male actors